+++ may refer to:

+++ (modem), a command to switch from data to command mode in modems in telecommunication, originally by Hayes
+++ (Leiden), a sign to indicate traces of letters according to the Leiden Conventions
+++ (Shulgin Rating Scale), a quantification for the subjective effect of psychoactive substances

See also

 xxx (disambiguation)
 
 + +
 ++ (disambiguation)
 + (disambiguation)